Charlotte Dean is a writer, illustrator, and visual artist known for writing and co-directing the show Charlotte's Shorts, along with Emmy award writer, director, and producer Tracy Newman.

Early life and education
Dean was born in Los Angeles, California. to Tracy Newman and James F. Dean, an actor, photographer, and graphic designer. She is also the niece of Laraine Newman, American comedian, actress, voice artist, writer, and  original SNL cast member. She grew up surrounded by the performing arts, spending much of her time as a child at the improvisational and sketch comedy troupe and school The Groundlings seeing her mother performing and teaching with the troupe formed by Gary Austin in 1974.

Dean is an alumna of Marlborough School, Los Angeles High School of the Arts, Bard College, and Cornish College of the Arts, from which she graduated summa cum laude.

Career
Dean began writing when she was a child, inspired by her father. After finishing high school she traveled to Mexico City, where she worked as a muralist and continued to write. Her visual artwork has been shown in Los Angeles, New York, Seattle, and Mexico City. Some of her work is part of the Ryan James Fine Arts gallery collection in Kirkland, Washington. She started her blog Charlotte's Shorts in 2008 while in France with her husband, Ro Reyes. In 2014, she made her short stories into a 90-minute show directed by Dean and her mother, Tracy Newman. The show's most recent production in Los Angeles was on October 28, 2014, at The Groundlings, with her aunt, Laraine Newman. Charlotte's Shorts was also performed at the SF Sketchfest on January 31, 2015.

Dean also writes and illustrates the My Crazy Baby Brother children's book series.

Personal life
Dean lives in Seattle, Washington with her husband. Together with her mother she runs a production company called Run Along Home Productions. Her son Logan was born in August 2017.

References

External links

http://patch.com/california/studiocity/back-by-popular-demaind-charlottes-shorts-featuring-snls-laraine-newman-and-members-of-the-groundlings
https://web.archive.org/web/20140903001356/http://groundlings.com/shows/show-details.aspx?showID=300
http://www.huffingtonpost.com/xaque-gruber/tracy-laraine-newman-keep_b_5179304.html
http://www.timeout.com/los-angeles/comedy/charlottes-shorts

Living people
American women artists
American women writers
American women illustrators
American children's book illustrators
Jewish American writers
Primetime Emmy Award winners
Bard College alumni
Cornish College of the Arts alumni
21st-century American Jews
21st-century American women
Year of birth missing (living people)